Jack Butler Yeats RHA (29 August 1871 – 28 March 1957) was an Irish artist and Olympic medalist. W. B. Yeats was his brother.

Butler's early style was that of an illustrator; he only began to work regularly in oils in 1906. His early pictures are simple lyrical depictions of landscapes and figures, predominantly from the west of Ireland—especially of his boyhood home of Sligo. Yeats's work contains elements of Romanticism. He later would adopt the style of Expressionism.

Biography
Yeats was born in London, England. He was the youngest son of Irish portraitist John Butler Yeats and the brother of W. B. Yeats, who received the 1923 Nobel Prize in Literature. He grew up in Sligo with his maternal grandparents, before returning to his parents' home in London in 1887.

Yeats attended the Chiswick School of Art with his sisters Elizabeth and Susan, learning "Freehand drawing in all its branches, practical Geometry and perspective, pottery and tile painting, design for decorative purposes – as in Wall-papers, Furniture, Metalwork, Stained Glass".

Early in his career, Yeats worked as an illustrator for magazines like the Boy's Own Paper and Judy, drew comic strips, including the Sherlock Holmes parody "Chubb-Lock Homes" for Comic Cuts, and wrote articles for Punch under the pseudonym "W. Bird". In 1894 he married Mary Cottenham, also a native of England and two years his senior, and resided in Wicklow according to the Census of Ireland, 1911.

From around 1920, he developed into an intensely Expressionist artist, moving from illustration to Symbolism. He was sympathetic to the Irish Republican cause, but not politically active. However, he believed that 'a painter must be part of the land and of the life he paints', and his own artistic development, as a Modernist and Expressionist, helped articulate a modern Dublin of the 20th century, partly by depicting specifically Irish subjects, but also by doing so in the light of universal themes such as the loneliness of the individual, and the universality of the plight of man. Samuel Beckett wrote that "Yeats is with the great of our time... because he brings light, as only the great dare to bring light, to the issueless predicament of existence." The Marxist art critic and author John Berger also paid tribute to Yeats from a very different perspective, praising the artist as a "great painter" with a "sense of the future, an awareness of the possibility of a world other than the one we know".

His favourite subjects included the Irish landscape, horses, circus and travelling players. His early paintings and drawings are distinguished by an energetic simplicity of line and colour, his later paintings by an extremely vigorous and experimental treatment of often thickly applied paint. He frequently abandoned the brush altogether, applying paint in a variety of different ways, and was deeply interested in the expressive power of colour. Despite his position as the most important Irish artist of the 20th century (and the first to sell for over £1m), he took no pupils and allowed no one to watch him work, so he remains a unique figure. The artist closest to him in style is his friend, the Austrian painter, Oskar Kokoschka.

In 1943 he accepted Victor Waddington as his sole dealer and business manager. Waddington played a crucial role in his career and reputation.

Besides painting, Yeats had a significant interest in theatre and in literature. He was a close friend of Samuel Beckett. He designed sets for the Abbey Theatre, and three of his own plays were also produced there. His literary works include The Careless Flower, The Amaranthers (much admired by Beckett), Ah Well, A Romance in Perpetuity, And To You Also, and The Charmed Life.  Yeats's paintings usually bear poetic and evocative titles. He was elected a member of the Royal Hibernian Academy in 1916. He died in Dublin in 1957, and was buried in Mount Jerome Cemetery.

Yeats holds the distinction of being Ireland's first medalist at the Olympic Games in the wake of creation of the Irish Free State. At the 1924 Summer Olympics in Paris, Yeats' painting The Liffey Swim won a silver medal in the arts and culture segment of the Games. In the competition records the painting is simply entitled Swimming.

Works
In November 2010, one of Yeats's works, A Horseman Enters a Town at Night, painted in 1948 and previously owned by novelist Graham Greene, sold for nearly £350,000 at a Christie's auction in London. A smaller work, Man in a Room Thinking, painted in 1947, sold for £66,000 at the same auction. His painting Sleep Sound (1955) was bought by David Bowie in 1993 for  £45,500 and sold at auction in 2016 for £233,000. In 1999 the painting, The Wild Ones, had sold at Sotheby's in London for over £1.2m. Whyte's Auctioneers hold the world record sale price for a Yeats painting, Reverie (1931), which sold for €1,400,000 in November 2019.

The Model, Home of The Niland Collection, in Sligo cares for one of the best and most extensive collections of Jack B. Yeats work in existence. It presents regular curated exhibitions of his work, notably, The Outside in 2011, Enter the Clowns - The Circus as Metaphor, 2013; The Music has Come, 2014; Painted Universe, 2018; Salt Water Ballads, 2021.

Hosting museums
 The Model, Sligo
 The Hunt Museum, Limerick
 National Gallery of Ireland, Dublin
 Crawford Art Gallery, Cork
 National Gallery of Canada, Ottawa
 Walters Art Museum, Baltimore
 The Swinford Funeral at the Walters Art Museum
 The Municipal Art Collection, Waterford
 Ulster Museum, Belfast
 The Snite Museum of Art, University of Notre Dame
 Driftwood in a Cave at the Snite Museum of Art

See also
Art competitions at the 1924 Summer Olympics

Notes

References
 Samuel Beckett.  1991.  Jack B. Yeats: The Late Paintings (Whitechapel Art Gallery)
 John Booth.  1993.  Jack B. Yeats: A Vision of Ireland  (House of Lochar)
 John W. Purser.  1991.  The Literary Universe of Jack B. Yeats (Rowman & Littlefield Publishers)
 Hilary Pyle.  1987.  Jack B. Yeats in the National Gallery of Ireland (National Gallery of Ireland)
 Hilary Pyle.  1989.  Jack B. Yeats: A Biography (Carlton Books)
 T.G. Rosenthal.  1993.  The Art of Jack B. Yeats (Carlton Books)
 Jack B. Yeats.  1992.  Selected Writings of Jack B. Yeats (Carlton Books)
 Declan J Foley (2009), ed. with an introduction by Bruce Stewart,The Only Art of Jack B. Yeats Letters and essays (Lilliput Press Dublin).

External links
 
 Jack B. Yeats at The Model, Sligo
 Cuala Press Broadside Collection, illustrated by Jack B. Yeats is located at the Special Collections/Digital Library in Falvey Memorial Library  at Villanova University.
 The Only Art: Letters of JBY
  The Fourth John Butler Yeats Seminar, at the Swift Theatre, Trinity College, Dublin  10–12 September 2010 details 
 Jack Butler Yeats' Illustrations from Punch in HeidICON
 
 
 
 
  Yeats Society Sligo 
 Irish Record Price for Yeats
 

1871 births
1957 deaths
19th-century Irish painters
Irish male painters
20th-century Irish painters
Burials at Mount Jerome Cemetery and Crematorium
Jack
Irish illustrators
Irish comics artists
Olympic artists for Ireland
Olympic silver medalists for Ireland
Olympic silver medalists in art competitions
People educated at Sligo Grammar School
People educated at The High School, Dublin
Artists' Rifles soldiers
Olympic competitors in art competitions
19th-century Irish male artists
20th-century Irish male artists